Serge Yvan Arthur Reding (23 December 1941 – 28 June 1975) was a Belgian heavyweight weightlifter. He competed in the 1964, 1968 and 1972 Olympics and won a silver medal in 1968. Between 1968 and 1974 he won four silver medals at the world championships and set six ratified world records: three in press, one in snatch and two in clean and jerk.

Reding was born in Auderghem to Adeline Gérard, an unmarried woman, and his father is unknown. When his mother married Ernest Reding from Herbeumont in 1953, Serge was adopted by Reding and took his family name. Reding grew attached to his stepfather and stayed with him after he divorced from his mother. He died of a heart attack in Manila, Philippines, a year after competing in the world championships there.

References

External links

 Serge Reding Profile
Serge Reding Hall of Fame at Weightlifting Exchange

1941 births
1975 deaths
People from Auderghem
Olympic weightlifters of Belgium
Olympic silver medalists for Belgium
Weightlifters at the 1964 Summer Olympics
Weightlifters at the 1968 Summer Olympics
Weightlifters at the 1972 Summer Olympics
Olympic medalists in weightlifting
Belgian male weightlifters
Medalists at the 1968 Summer Olympics
European Weightlifting Championships medalists
World Weightlifting Championships medalists
Sportspeople from Brussels
20th-century Belgian people